Hornick may refer to:

Hornick, Cornwall, United Kingdom
Hornick, Iowa, United States